Abdullah Al-Mutairi (born 1 July 1986) is a professional footballer who plays a midfielder .

Career
Born in  family living in Mecca, he spent the entire career representing various clubs in Saudi Arabia as a defending midfielder, scoring only two goals as he later fractured with an injury and retired in 2020.

References

External links 
 

1986 births
Living people
Al-Ahli Saudi FC players
Al-Faisaly FC players
Al-Wehda Club (Mecca) players
Al-Fayha FC players
Kuwaiti footballers
Saudi Arabian footballers
Saudi Professional League players
Saudi First Division League players
Association football midfielders